Lángos is a typical Hungarian food. Today it is a deep fried flatbread, but in the past it was made of the last bits of the bread-dough and baked at the front of the brick or clay oven, to be served hot as the breakfast of the bread-baking day.

Etymology and history 

The name comes from láng, the Hungarian word for flame.

Up to the mid 20th century, bread was baked once a week due to the cost of heating up the large oven and the lengthy process kneading up to 80 pounds of dough. Because the bread loaf, typical to Hungary, was 6 to 10 pounds each, traditionally they used to bake smaller (1-2 pounds) "cipó" rolls for the evening and the next day. The name lángos (literally meaning "flamed") comes from baking these flat breads in the morning while the oven was still heating up. "Lángos" were also used as a side to lunch.

After the communist takeover, with no large scale flour stocks in private households, and as nearly everybody became an employee working in shifts, traditional bread-baking procedure diminished. People started to buy their bread in foodstores in smaller quantities. With no leftover dough and no oven heated up, no lángos was baked. 
After the revolution in 1956, very small scale businesses were allowed again and some people started to open small buds in the larger markets to sell a new kind of lángos, fried in lard or sunflower oil. It became very popular and it was the ultimate streetfood along with the sausages "hurka & kolbász" in the 1960s and '70s. Up to the early '80s, there were only 3 varieties: plain (w/ or w/o garlic and salt) and with cabbage or potato in the dough. The first new varieties introduced in the '80s were with sour cream and grated cheese. In the mid 1980s hotdogs and hamburgers became the new favorite streetfoods of the Hungarians, but in the mid '90s lángos came back with many new varieties and has since spread across the globe.

Variations

The dough for lángos is made of water or milk, flour, yeast, and salt. The ingredients are worked together either by hand or a kneading machine. As the yeast starts to metabolize the carbohydrates in the flour, carbon dioxide is released which causes the dough to rise, creating the air bubbles in the lángos. The dough is basically the same as pizza dough, but it is not baked but fried in oil. Adding sour cream, yoghurt or mashed potatoes to the dough is optional but highly encouraged, in the latter case it is called potato lángos (in Hungarian krumplis lángos). It is eaten fresh and warm, topped with sour cream and grated cheese, or Liptauer, ham, or sausages, or most frequently, without toppings, just rubbed with garlic or garlic butter, or doused with garlic water. Other ingredients and accompaniments can be mushroom, quark cheese, eggplant, cabbage, kefir, omelet, and confectioner's sugar or jam.
 

In the early 2000s, some people built small, portable clay ovens and started to sell oven baked lángos, called "kenyérlángos" (bread-lángos) on festivals and fairs. Although reminiscent of the traditional lángos, it is more like a pizza with sour cream, onions and bacon.

Lángos is popular all year long. As it is a rather affordable and simple food, it is often sold around bus stations, fairs, local markets and all over Eastern European countries during local celebrations or sport events. It is sold at many fast-food restaurants not only in Hungary but also in Austria. In Austria, especially in Vienna, lángos is very popular as a fast food at fairs and in amusement parks like the Prater. Lángos is known in the Czech Republic, Slovakia and Croatia as langoš, in Serbia as languš (although it is commonly called "Mekike"). In Slovenia it is known as Langaš and in Macedonia and Bulgaria  as Mekitsa. It is also popular in Romania (especially in Transylvania) as langoși.  It is also extremely popular in Poland where it is known as "langosz" and in the UK where it's called "langos" or "Hungarian Fried Bread."

See also
 List of doughnut varieties
 List of deep fried foods
 Frybread
 Shelpek
 Bhatoora
 Mekitsa
 BeaverTails
 National symbols of Hungary

References

External links

Hungarian dishes
Flatbreads
Romanian breads
Ottoman cuisine
Street food
Doughnuts
Greek breads
Turkish breads